The 1993 Qatar Open, known as the Qatar Mobil Open for sponsorship reasons, was an ATP Tour men's tennis tournament held in Doha, Qatar from 4 January until 11 January 1993. It was the inaugural edition of the tournament. 

The tournament saw third-seeded Boris Becker claim his 1st title of the year, and the 51st of his career.

Finals

Singles

 Boris Becker defeated  Goran Ivanišević, 7–6(7–4), 4–6, 7–5
 It was Becker's 1st singles title of the year and the 37th of his career.

Doubles

 Boris Becker /  Patrik Kühnen defeated  Shelby Cannon /  Scott Melville, 6–2, 6–4

References

External links 
 ATP tournament profile